The Kakegurui – Compulsive Gambler manga is written by Homura Kawamoto and illustrated by Tōru Naomura. It has been serialized in Square Enix's Gangan Joker since March 22, 2014. It is licensed for English released in North America by Yen Press. A prequel spin-off manga, Kakegurui Twin, began serialization in Gangan Joker on September 21, 2015.

Main series

Kakegurui – Compulsive Gambler

Spin-offs

Kakegurui Twin

Kakegurui (Kakkokari)

Kakegurui Midari

References 

Kakegurui